The Case Against Andrew Fane is a 1931 mystery detective novel by the British writer Anthony Gilbert, the pen name of British writer Lucy Beatrice Malleson. It was a stand-alone novel by the author who was at the best time known for her Golden Age detective Scott Egerton.

Synopsis
Facing five years in prison for fraud unless he can secure money quickly Andrew Fane goes to visit his wealthy, eccentric uncle. However, after encountering a mysterious and heavily veiled woman at his property, he finds him dead. Panicking his actions make him seem the prime suspect to the investigating police who appear to have an open-and-shut case against him.

References

Bibliography
 Hubin, Allen J. Crime Fiction, 1749-1980: A Comprehensive Bibliography. Garland Publishing, 1984.
 Reilly, John M. Twentieth Century Crime & Mystery Writers. Springer, 2015.

1931 British novels
British mystery novels
British thriller novels
Novels by Anthony Gilbert
Novels set in England
British detective novels
Collins Crime Club books
Dodd, Mead & Co. books